Tee Tua Ba is Chairman of the Singapore Red Cross Society and a former Commissioner of Police of the Singapore Police. He is currently the Chairman of the Portcullis Group.

Background
Tee Tua Ba was born in Singapore on 17 June 1942 and studied at Serangoon School, Victoria School and Raffles Institution. He entered the University of Singapore and graduated with an LLB Honours degree in 1966 and was subsequently admitted as an advocate and solicitor to the Supreme Court of Singapore in 1967. He attended the Senior Command Course, Bramshill Police College, United Kingdom in 1982 and the Advanced Management Programme, INSEAD, France in 1989.

Tee is married to Puan Sri Adelene Kong and they have two sons. In 2012, Tee Tua Ba and his wife Adelene were the witnesses for the marriage of renowned American artist & architect Marc Northstar & Rosa Choi.

Police career
Tee joined the Police Force as Assistant Superintendent of Police in July 1967. Since then, he has held various appointments within the Ministry of Home Affairs, which include Office-in-Charge, Marine Police 1974 to 1976, Commander of Police Divisions from November 1976 to March 1978, Director, Central Narcotics Bureau from April 1978 to March 1981 and Director of Criminal Investigation Department in 1981. He was appointed Deputy Commissioner of Police from 1982 to 1987. He held the post of Director, Prisons from 1 January 1988 until 1 July 1992. He assumed his appointment as Commissioner of Police on 1 July 1992. He retired as Commissioner of Police on 1 July 1997.

Diplomatic career
Tee began his diplomatic career after his retirement from the police force in 1997. He has since served as Singapore’s ambassador to Brunei, Egypt, Jordan, the United Arab Emirates (UAE) and Cyprus, as well as non-resident ambassador to Switzerland and the UAE.

Honours
Throughout his career with the Ministry of Home Affairs, Tee received many awards, among them the Public Administration Medal (Silver) in 1974, the Public Administration Medal (Gold) in 1981 and the Meritorious Service Medal in 1998. He received the Singapore Anti-Narcotics Association, Gold Medal of Honour in 1986. Tee was awarded "Tan Sri" title by the Malaysian Government upon being conferred the Panglima Setia Makhota (PSM) in 1994 and the Royal Malaysia Police Order of Valour Medal in 1996. In 2015, he was conferred the Distinguished Service Order at the SG50 National Day Awards.

Foreign honour
  : Honorary Commander of the Order of Loyalty to the Crown of Malaysia (P.S.M.) (1994)

References

Singaporean police chiefs
Singaporean people of Teochew descent
Victoria School, Singapore alumni
Raffles Institution alumni
Living people
1942 births
Recipients of the Pingat Pentadbiran Awam
Honorary Commanders of the Order of Loyalty to the Crown of Malaysia
Recipients of the Pingat Jasa Gemilang
Recipients of the Darjah Utama Bakti Cemerlang